JS Genkai is a Hiuchi Class Auxiliary Multi-purpose Support (AMS) ship of the Japan Maritime Self-Defense Force (JMSDF).<ref>Werth, Eric. (2007). {{Google books|TJunjRvplU4C|Naval Institute Guide to Combat Fleets of the World, p. 392.|page=392}}</ref>

The ship was built by Universal in Keihin and commissioned into service on 20 Feb 2008.

The primary mission of the Genkai is to support training exercises of other ships, including shooting practice and torpedo launching practice.

Notes

References
 Werth, Eric. (2007). Naval Institute Guide to Combat Fleets of the World: Their Ships, Aircraft, and Systems.''  Annapolis: Naval Institute Press.

External links
 JMSDF,  AMS-4304  げんかい Genkai
 Global Security.com,  AMS Hiuchi Class, ship list

Hiuchi-class support ships
2007 ships